Alireza Davood Nejad (born December 7, 1953 in Tehran) is an Iranian director, screenwriter, and producer. His son is the TV actor Reza Davood Nejad.

Filmography

as Director 
 Sweet Agony 2, 2018 - In production
 Ferrari, 2017
 Snake Oil, 2016
 Actors Studio, 2013  
 Salve, 2010  
 Tigh-zan, 2008  
 Havoo, 2006  
 Hashtpa, 2005  
 Meet the Parrot, 2003  
 Bachehaye bad, 2000  
 Behesht az ane to, 2000  
 Sweet Agony, 2000  
 Asheghane, 1995  
 Khal'e selah, 1993  
 Niaz, 1992  
 Bipanah, 1987  
 The House of Spider, 1983  
 Jayeze, 1982  
 Ghadeghan, 1978  
 Asheghane, 1977   
 Nazanin, 1976  
 Shahrag, 1975

 as Writer 
 Tootia'', 1998

References

External links

1953 births
Iranian film directors
Living people
Iranian screenwriters
Iranian film producers
Writers from Tehran
Producers who won the Best Film Crystal Simorgh
Crystal Simorgh for Best Screenplay winners